The 1944 South Carolina Gamecocks football team was an American football team that represented the University of South Carolina as a member of the Southern Conference (SoCon) during the 1944 college football season. In their first and only season under head coach Williams Newton, the Gamecocks compiled an overall record of 3–4–2 with a mark of 1–3 in conference play, placing seventh in the SoCon.

Schedule

References

South Carolina
South Carolina Gamecocks football seasons
South Carolina Gamecocks football